Charles Henry York (27 March 1883 – 1955) was a Scottish professional footballer who played as a forward for various clubs in Scotland and England, including Derby County, with whom he was on the losing side in the 1903 FA Cup Final, Sunderland and Southampton.

References

1883 births
1955 deaths
Footballers from Edinburgh
Scottish footballers
Association football forwards
Swindon Town F.C. players
Reading F.C. players
Derby County F.C. players
Sunderland A.F.C. players
Heart of Midlothian F.C. players
Southampton F.C. players
Sheppey United F.C. players
South Farnborough Athletic F.C. players
English Football League players
Southern Football League players
FA Cup Final players